2011 CECAFA Cup squads are the squads that competed in the 2011 CECAFA Cup.

Group A









Group B









Group C









References 

squads